was a legendary local ruler of Okinawa Island.

He was the second ruler of the Eiso dynasty; that is, his father was King Eisō and his son was King Eiji. The years of Taisei's reign were uneventful. Taisei was the grandfather of Tamagusuku.

Notes

References
 Kerr, George H. (1965). Okinawa, the History of an Island People. Rutland, Vermont: C.E. Tuttle Co. OCLC  39242121
 Nussbaum, Louis-Frédéric. (2002).  Japan Encyclopedia. Cambridge: Harvard University Press. ; OCLC 48943301

1247 births
1309 deaths
Kings of Ryūkyū
13th-century Ryukyuan people
14th-century Ryukyuan people